Henry Huggins is the first book in the Henry Huggins series of children's novels, written by Beverly Cleary. Henry is an ordinary boy who manages to get into funny scrapes with his dog, Ribsy. First published on September 6, 1950, it was originally illustrated by Louis Darling and later by Tracy Dockray. It has been translated into Bulgarian, Chinese, Danish, Dutch, Finnish, Hebrew, Japanese, Norwegian, Spanish, and Swedish, and published as audio books read by Barbara Caruso and Neil Patrick Harris.

The book was a response to a letter from a child saying, "Where are the books about the kids like us?" One critic called the character of "Henry" the "modern Tom Sawyer."

The character of Henry Huggins returned in later books and also in a play which was written by Beverly Cleary and Cynthia J. McGean.

Books in the series 
 Henry Huggins, published in 1950
 Henry and Beezus, published in 1952
 Henry and Ribsy, published in 1954
 Henry and the Paper Route, published in 1957
 Henry and the Clubhouse, published in 1962
 Ribsy, published in 1964

References

External links

 

Novels by Beverly Cleary
Novels set in Portland, Oregon
1950 American novels
1950 children's books